Red label may refer to:

Toxicity label
A Scotch whisky from Johnnie Walker